Final Oscillations is a compilation album by American composer Bill Laswell, released on May 5, 2003 by Quatermass Records. It comprises Oscillations and Oscillations 2 in their entirety in addition to several tracks taken from Oscillations Remixes.

Track listing

Personnel 
Adapted from the Final Oscillations liner notes.
Bill Laswell – bass guitar, drum programming, effects, producer 
Robert Musso – engineering

Release history

References

External links 
 

2003 compilation albums
Bill Laswell compilation albums
Albums produced by Bill Laswell
Sub Rosa Records compilation albums